endPoverty.org is a faith-based 501(c)(3) non-profit organization whose mission is to empower the working poor in developing countries to lift themselves out of poverty. It accomplishes this by providing small loans and technical assistance through a network of locally led partner organizations in 12 countries to equip families living in poverty to improve their own lives.

Organization
endPoverty.org is headquartered in Bethesda, United States, and currently works with a partner network of microfinance and development institutions in twelve countries: Uganda, South Africa, Egypt, Philippines, Bangladesh, India, Romania, Slovakia, Guatemala, Mexico, Nicaragua and the United States.

History
endPoverty.org was founded in 1985 out of the vision of Paris Reidhead, an American missionary in Sudan, to equip poor entrepreneurs to help themselves and their families out of poverty.  The organization's former names include Enterprise Development International and Transformation International.

References

External links

Microfinance organizations
Development charities based in the United States
Charities based in Maryland